Léon de Bercy, called Léon Drouin de Bercy or  Léon Hiks (10 December 1857 in Paris – 31 July 1915 in Orléans, aged 57) was a French chansonnier.

A member of the literary club , he authored the reference book Montmartre et ses chansons : Poètes et Chansonniers (1902). He also collaborated with Aristide Bruant to L'Argot au XXe siècle. Dictionnaire français-argot.

Songs or monologues 
Le Milliard congréganiste (1910), satirical ditty, lyrics by Léon de Bercy and V. Tarault, éd. Georges Ondet (cotage GO4396bis)
Ne jurez pas aux femmes (c. 1895), ditty, lyrics by Briollet and Hiks, music by Tiska et Del, Répertoire libre. Recorded under the title Illusions fichues ou Ne jurez pas aux femmes, Odéon 238385 (undated)
Series Les Refrains de la Butte (1904) under the pseudonym Léon Drouin de Bercy, éd. Plessis :
Une drôle de maison,
Le Brave Général Oku, fantaisie rosso-japonaise
La Cravate à Jean
Le Petit Frère à Ferdinand
La Vaseline

Works 
Aristide Bruant (with collaboration of Léon Drouin de Bercy), L'Argot au XXe. Dictionnaire français-argot, Flammarion, Paris, 1901, 457 p.
Léon de Bercy, Montmartre et ses chansons : Poètes et Chansonniers, with 5 portraits-charges by Charles Léandre, éd. H. Daragon, Paris, 1902 (available on Gallica)

Sources 
 Dix ans de bohème on wikisource 
Émile Goudeau, Dix ans de bohème, Henry du Parc, Paris, 1888 – Reprint under the direction of Michel Golfier and Jean-Didier Wagneur (with coll. of Patrick Ramseyer), Champvallon, 2000, 573 p.

References 

French lyricists
French chansonniers
1857 births
Writers from Paris
1915 deaths